Theatre of the World is the fifth and last opera by Dutch composer Louis Andriessen, with a libretto by Helmut Krausser. Subtitled A Grotesque Stagework in 9 Scenes, the work concerns itself with the life of 17th-century Jesuit scholar Athanasius Kircher and was premiered at the Walt Disney Concert Hall in Los Angeles 6 May 2016, a co-production between Los Angeles Philharmonic and Dutch National Opera, conducted by Reinbert de Leeuw. The title alludes to the Catholic idea that life is a great play with God as the author, a concept also found in Shakespeare's "All the world's a stage" passage.

Roles

Synopsis
Kircher, aged 76, meets a boy of about twelve years who we learn is the devil. He takes the unsuspecting Kircher, together with his patron Pope Innocent XI (who cannot see the boy), on a magical journey through ancient Egypt, China and Babylon. Kircher was renowned for building fanciful theories based on weak material and as the journey unfolds his outlandish ideas begin to unravel before our eyes. Kircher starts to become increasingly anxious and suspicious. We learn that earlier in his life, Kircher had mistakenly given his soul to the devil instead of to God during his narrow escape from Protestant mercenaries. The boy now curses Kircher and orders him to be broken by illness. On his deathbed Kircher requests the hangman to cut out his heart and take it to a shrine of the Virgin. On doing so, the boy grabs the heart and eats it only to discover that Kircher's soul has evaded him.

The opera is scored for the singers and full orchestra plus eight guest musicians playing: clarinet, bass clarinet, alto saxophone, tenor saxophone, percussion, keyboards, bass guitar and electric guitar.

Reception
There was a mixed reception to the stage work and subsequent CD release. Gramophone wrote that Andriessen's score was "Immediate, transparent and almost disarmingly direct" while Opera News noted Andriessen was trying a softer approach: "A welcome change from his works' usual sensory overload, though the score drags during its many bland transitional passages." Music & Literature said "Marked by a consistency of texture and polished with stunning orchestrational élan, Andriessen's music managed to effectively underscore the truly grotesque array of action on stage, while somehow remaining elegant at all times. It was stunning." The Guardian said of the recording "a superb surreal journey". The Los Angeles Times claims it will "stand the test of time".

Language
Krausser's libretto is written in seven languages. German is the most frequent while English, Latin, Spanish, Old Dutch, Italian and French can occur mid-sentence. Kircher's first line for example "..In questa necropoli I enjoy my melancholy".  Stageraw's Myron Meisel wrote "It's all too polyglot and prolix to be considered a masterpiece, let alone accessible.."

References

Operas by Louis Andriessen
2016 operas
Operas set in the 17th century
Operas
Multiple-language operas